Adoratrices Handmaids of the Blessed Sacrament and of Charity is a Roman Catholic religious order founded in 1856 by María Micaela of the Blessed Sacrament in Madrid, Spain.

History
The Handmaids of the Blessed Sacrament and of Charity was founded in 1856 in Spain. Founder Maria Michaela Desmaisieres was elected Mother General in 1859.

There have been allegations that, for decades, under the dictatorship of Francisco Franco, the girls and young women -- often those who were  unmarried ("fallen") young mothers, left-wing activists or otherwise seen as rebellious -- were placed in the order's convents, where they were required to work without remuneration, made to suffer psychological distress, and, in some cases, had their babies stolen from them to be placed with "more traditional" families.

Current work
As of 2008, there were about 1,300 members in 22 countries, including Japan, Cambodia, Vietnam, and most Latin American countries.

Project "Hope", founded in 1999, includes three homes for women who have been involved in prostitution or human trafficking.

See also
Catholic Church in Italy

References

External links
 Supporting women affected by prostitution and victims of sex trafficking in the United Kingdom 
 Supporting victims of sex trafficking in Spain 
 Supporting victims of sex trafficking in Spain
 Amaranta Solidarity Foundation promoting the human rights of women in prostitution and victims of sex trafficking worldwide by developing sustainable support programmes in Asia, Africa, Europe and Latin America

Catholic female orders and societies
Religious organizations established in 1856
Catholic religious institutes established in the 19th century
1856 establishments in Spain